Krzysztof Markowski (born 24 September 1979 in Zabrze) is a Polish footballer who plays for Cyklon Rogoźnik.

Career

In February 2011, he joined Zagłębie Sosnowiec on one and a half year contract. He signed for the newly reformed Polonia Bytom in August 2017.

References

External links
 

1979 births
Living people
Polish footballers
Ruch Radzionków players
Odra Wodzisław Śląski players
GKS Katowice players
Polonia Warsaw players
Zagłębie Sosnowiec players
Kolejarz Stróże players
Sportspeople from Zabrze
Association football defenders